Early parliamentary elections were held in Nauru on 8 April 2000. All candidates ran as independents. Following the election René Harris was elected President by the Parliament, defeating Bernard Dowiyogo by one vote. However, following the resignation of Speaker Ludwig Scotty and Deputy Speaker Ross Cain, Cain resigned, and Dowiyogo was subsequently elected president. Voter turnout was 88.8%.

Results

References

Nauru
2000 in Nauru
Elections in Nauru
Non-partisan elections
Election and referendum articles with incomplete results